Torrens is the surname of:

 Alba Torrens (born 1989), Spanish basketball player
 Albert Torrens (born 1976), Australian rugby league footballer
 Attwood Torrens (1874–1916), English cricketer and soldier
 Cristina Torrens Valero (born 1974), professional female tennis player from Spain
 Henry Torrens (1823–1889), British lieutenant general and colonial governor
 Henry Torrens (British Army officer) (1779–1828), British major general and Adjutant-General to the Forces
 Hugh Torrens, British historian of geology and paleontology
 Jackie Torrens, Canadian writer, actor, documentary-maker and journalist
 James H. Torrens (1874–1952), American congressman and influential Tammany Hall figure
 Jonathan Torrens (born 1972), Canadian actor and television personality, brother of Jackie Torrens
 Luis Torrens (born 1996), Venezuelan baseball player
 Philip Torrens (born 1960), British actor (a.k.a. Pip Torrens)
 Robert Richard Torrens (1812–1884), third Premier of colonial South Australia
 Robert Torrens (economist) (1780–1864), Chairman of the South Australian Colonisation Commissioners, and father of the above
 Robert Torrens (judge) (1775–1856), Irish judge and brother of Major-General Henry Torrens
 Roy Torrens (born 1948), Northern Irish cricketer
 William McCullagh Torrens (1813–1894), Irish Liberal politician and member of the House of Commons for various English constituencies

See also
Torrens (disambiguation)
 Michael Torrens-Spence (1914–2001), British officer in three services and the Royal Ulster Constabulary

Surnames of Catalan origin